Biel/Bienne District was a district (Amtsbezirk) in the canton of Bern in Switzerland with its seat Biel/Bienne. It was bi-lingual (41% French and 59% German) and included two municipalities in an area of 25 km²:

It is now part of the administrative district of Biel/Bienne.

External links 

Official Website of the city of Biel/Bienne
Tourism Information for Biel/Bienne and Region
Portal with numerous trip suggestions in the Seeland region
Portal with numerous trip suggestions in the Bern Jura region
Events Calendar
bnct.ch :: Nightlife
Watch Valley

Former districts of the canton of Bern